Ballapur is a town in the local government area of the Shire of Buloke, Victoria, Australia. The post office there opened as Ballapur State School in 1902, renamed Ballapur in 1907 and was closed on 10 March 1916.

References